Craig Benjamin Jones (born July 17, 1991) is an Australian grappler and Brazilian jiu-jitsu black belt competitor and coach. An IBJJF world No-Gi Brazilian jiu-jitsu champion as a purple belt, Jones is a two-time  ADCC Submission Wrestling World Championship silver medallist and a three-time Polaris Pro Grappling champion. Jones trains out of Austin, Texas and is the head of B-Team Jiu-Jitsu.

Biography 
Craig Jones was born on 17 July 1991, in Adelaide, South Australia. In 2006 Jones started training Brazilian jiu-jitsu (BJJ) at his cousin's academy. After getting his purple belt, Jones moved to Melbourne where he started training under Lachlan Giles. In 2014 Jones won gold at the NAGA World Championship and gold at the AFBJJ Pan Pacific Championship, a tournament held annually in Melbourne. The following year, in 2015 Jones qualified for the 2015 ADCC World Championships, a submission grappling tournament held every 2 years and often referred to as the "Olympics of grappling", after winning the ADCC Asia and Oceania Trials in the - division. Jones lost ADCC World first round by submission to Romulo Barral but won the IBJJF World No-Gi Championships in the purple belt division, the first Australian male to win an IBJJF world championship. A year later in 2016 Jones won bronze at the Abu Dhabi World Professional Jiu-Jitsu Championship in the brown belt division. In 2016 Jones was promoted to black belt by Giles while training at Absolute MMA Academy.

In 2017 Jones qualified again for the ADCC World, this time during the Championship Jones submitted 5x Black Belt World Champion Leandro Lo, Unity BJJ coach Murilo Santana and Chael Sonnen before losing the semi-final to Keenan Cornelius and the 3rd place to Alexander Ribeiro. In 2019 Jones won silver at the ADCC Submission Fighting Championship.

Jones faced UFC veteran Donald Cerrone in a Combat Jiu-Jitsu superfight at the Combat Jiu-Jitsu Featherweight World Championships on December 19, 2021 and submitted him with a rear-naked choke in regulation time. In 2022, Jones returned to ADCC and won silver again after moving to the -99 kg division, defeating 3 x World Champion Nicholas Meregali in the semi-final He was booked to compete in a rematch against Meregali at Who's Number One on February 25, 2023 but had to withdraw and the match was postponed.

Jones currently trains at B-Team Jiu-Jitsu in Austin, Texas alongside Nicky Ryan, Nicky Rod and Ethan Crelinsten. He is the BJJ coach of UFC Featherweight Champion, Alexander Volkanovski. He also served as the BJJ coach for Team Volkanovski on The Return of The Ultimate Fighter: Team Volkanovski vs. Team Ortega.

Grappling competitive summary 
Jones' main accomplishments as black belt:
 Polaris 17 Middleweight Champion (2021)
 Polaris 10 Middleweight Champion (2019)
 Polaris 8 Light Heavyweight Champion (2018)
 Polaris 6 Middleweight Champion (2018)
 Submission Underground Absolute Champion (2019)
 2nd place ADCC Submission Fighting World Championship (2019/2022)
 3rd Place EBI 11 Invitational (2017)
 3rd place Kasai 2 185 lbs Grand Prix (2018)
 3rd place Kasai 5 205 lbs Grand Prix (2019)

Main accomplishments in coloured belts:
 IBJJF World Championship NoGi (2015 purple)
 AFBJJ Pan Pacific Championship (2014 purple)
 ADCC Asian & Oceania World Trials (2014 / 2016)
 NAGA World Championship (2014 purple)
 3rd place UAEJJF Abu Dhabi Pro (2016 brown)

Personal life 
Jones has also completed a Bachelor's in Behavioural Science (Psychology). In 2020, Jones moved to Puerto Rico with Gordon Ryan and other members of the Danaher Death Squad, before he eventually relocated to Austin, Texas to found B-Team Jiu-Jitsu in 2021.

Jones operates an OnlyFans account, and has made appearances on several popular podcasts like The Joe Rogan Experience and InfoWars with Alex Jones.

Instructor lineage 
Carlos Gracie → Helio Gracie → Carlos Gracie Jr → Jean Jacques Machado / Rigan Machado → John Will → John Simon → Lachlan Giles → Craig Jones

Notes

References

External links 
 B-Team Jiu-Jitsu

1991 births
Living people
Sportspeople from Adelaide
Sportsmen from South Australia
Australian practitioners of Brazilian jiu-jitsu
Australian submission wrestlers
Australian male sport wrestlers
People awarded a black belt in Brazilian jiu-jitsu
Submission grapplers